Morrisonia confusa (the confused woodgrain) is a moth of the family Noctuidae. It is found in Eastern North America down to Florida, in the north it can be found up to Nova Scotia, New Brunswick, Quebec and Ontario.

The wingspan is about 35 mm. The moth flies from April to June depending on the location.

The larvae feed on various deciduous trees, including basswood, birch, ironwood, oak, poplar, sweet gale, and wild black cherry.

Gallery

External links
 Butterfliesandmoths.org
 Bug Guide

Hadeninae
Moths of North America